Grêmio Esportivo Brasil, commonly referred to as Brasil de Pelotas, is a Brazilian professional club based in Pelotas, Rio Grande do Sul founded on 7 September 1911. It competes in the Campeonato Brasileiro Série C, the third tier of Brazilian football, as well as in the Campeonato Gaúcho, the top flight of the Rio Grande do Sul state football league.

History

Grêmio Esportivo Brasil was founded after a dispute between players and directors of Sport Club Cruzeiro do Sul, which was supported and managed by employees of Cervejaria Haertel. On September 7, 1911, the Brazilian Independence anniversary, the club was founded at Santa Cruz street, in the residence of José Moreira de Brito, father of one of the former members of Cruzeiro do Sul, after a meeting between him and the other former members. The colours chosen were yellow and green, which are the colors of Brazil. Later, the club changed its colours to red and black, after Clube Diamantinos, a defunct club. The colours were also changed because EC Pelotas, rival of Brasil has similar colours.

The greatest moment in the club's history came during the 1985 Brazilian League, when Brasil managed to reach the semi-finals after moving past giants such as Flamengo. However, the club from Pelotas did not manage to defeat Bangu from Rio de Janeiro and ended up missing the glory of taking part in the final match.

The following years were not nearly as successful. Even though the club was frequently invited to take part in the Brazilian League due to their fanatic crowd, performances were usually disappointing. In the league of Rio Grande do Sul, the club spent a few years in the second division. In 2004, Brasil won the second division of the regional league, the first title in many years.

On January 16, 2009 the team bus plunged 130 ft into a ravine in Rio Grande do Sul when returning from a friendly match against Santa Cruz. Striker Claudio Milar, defender Regis and goalkeeping coach Giovani were killed in the accident caused by the driver losing control when making a turn, more than 20 others were injured.

Rivalries

Brasil de Pelotas' biggest rival is Pelotas, that together make the biggest derby in the southern region of the state, and one of the biggest in the state of Rio Grande do Sul. Another rival is Farroupilha.

Stadium

Brasil de Pelotas' stadium is the Estádio Bento Freitas, built in 1943. The stadium has a maximum capacity of 12,000 people.

Players

Current squad

Out on loan

Honours
 Campeonato Gaúcho
 Winners (1): 1919

 Campeonato Gaúcho Série A2
 Winners (3): 1961, 2004, 2013

See also
List of accidents involving sports teams

References

External links
 Official Site
 Brasil de Pelotas on Globo Esporte

Grêmio Esportivo Brasil
Association football clubs established in 1911
Football clubs in Rio Grande do Sul
Football clubs in Brazil
1911 establishments in Brazil